CHCI may be:
Cameron Heights Collegiate Institute
Cameron Heights, Edmonton
Chimpanzee and Human Communication Institute
Congressional Hispanic Caucus Institute